The Sabres Hockey Network is the official radio network and production company of the Buffalo Sabres of the National Hockey League (NHL). The network is currently operated jointly by the Sabres (Pegula Sports and Entertainment) and Audacy, Inc.

Rick Jeanneret is the network's primary play-by-play voice and has served in that capacity since 1971, with Rob Ray currently serving as color commentator. In the 2008–2009 season, former Winnipeg Jets/Phoenix Coyotes broadcaster Curt Keilback covered for Jeanneret during the team's western road trip. In the 2009–2010 season, the Sabres did not send their television broadcast crew on the western road trip and used the local broadcasts of the Phoenix Coyotes, Anaheim Ducks, Los Angeles Kings and Vancouver Canucks as the "home" broadcast. Jeanneret and then color commentator Harry Neale had reduced duties for 2011–2012, with the duo only handling home games and a third of the road games; Kevin Sylvester and Danny Gare handled the broadcasts of the remaining games that season.

The radio network's postgame show is hosted by WGR personality Brian Koziol.  Mike Schopp and Chris "Bulldog" Parker host the pre-game show, which airs only on WGR. On television, a pregame show and postgame show are broadcast, and hosted by Brian Duff and Martin Biron. (Prior to 2005, the television pregame-postgame shows were simulcast on radio. The postgame was known as Hockey Hotline and hosted by Mike Robitaille, first with host Brian Blessing and then Josh Mora.)

The theme song for broadcasts has been the "Sabre Dance" by Aram Khachaturian since the team's debut. From the 2006 Stanley Cup Playoffs through the 2009–10 season, the team used for its main theme an instrumental cut of "Hurricane 2000," an orchestral arrangement of the song "Rock You Like a Hurricane" recorded by Scorpions and the Berlin Philharmonic Orchestra on the album Moment of Glory. From the 1990s through 2006 the team used a custom-made theme.  Beginning shortly after Terry Pegula's acquisition of the team, the song was changed back to "Sabre Dance." For the 2011–12 season, a hard-rock version of "Sabre Dance" rotates with MSG Network's standard hockey theme as the theme for the Sabres Hockey Network broadcasts.

Current Radio Network
WGR 550 AM Buffalo, New York (flagship station)
WCMF 96.5 FM Rochester, New York
WROC 950 AM Rochester, New York (only when not in conflict with Rochester Americans games)
WQRS 98.3 FM Salamanca/Olean, New York
WBTA 1490 AM Batavia, New York
WQFX-FM 103.1 FM Russell, Pennsylvania (Jamestown, New York/Warren, Pennsylvania area)
WDOE 1410 AM Dunkirk, New York
WPGO 820 AM Elmira, New York
WOTT 94.1 FM Watertown, New York
WQTK 92.7 FM Ogdensburg, New York

Television
The Sabres Hockey Network has produced Sabres games since the team's days on the Empire Sports Network; Empire and the Sabres were both under the control of John Rigas from 1996 until Rigas's arrest in 2003. Prior to the launch of the Empire Sports Network, Sabres telecasts were managed under the brand Niagara Frontier Sports Network and syndicated to local television stations. NFSN briefly owned the station now known as WNYO-TV in the late 1980s but sold off that station after a short time after it became clear that scrambled subscription over-the-air television (a proposition that NFSN had planned on being its primary business model) was not going to be a viable enterprise and launched the cable- and satellite-exclusive Empire Sports Network instead.

On September 10, 2016, MSG launched a Buffalo-centric version of MSG Network called MSG Western New York, which incorporates content from both the Sabres and the Buffalo Bills including 70 Sabres games. The play-by-play and commentary is radio simulcasted over video, an arrangement unique in the National Hockey League. The other 12 games air only on the radio network, including all games broadcast on the league's national outlets. In New York City and the surrounding areas, Sabres games against the New York Rangers, New York Islanders or New Jersey Devils (other hockey teams to which MSG owns TV rights) have usually carried the Sabres Hockey Network feed on the SAP of MSG or MSG Plus. The Sabres also have the capabilities to broadcast preseason home games on the team's Web site.

MSG Western New York is carried on DirecTV, channel . The network is also available on Charter Spectrum, the predominant cable provider in New York State. The channel is available on Verizon FiOS, with high-definition feeds only arriving in late 2011 after a protracted legal dispute in which MSG refused to provide Verizon with an HD feed. The channel and therefore most Sabres games are not available on Dish Network due to a years-long continuing carriage dispute between the Dish and MSG Networks.

The practice of syndicating games to a local broadcast station has happened only once since MSG took over the broadcast contract: WGRZ and WHEC-TV were given rights to simulcast MSG's coverage of the February 11, 2012 game between the Sabres and the Tampa Bay Lightning, as a one-time goodwill gesture in the ongoing dispute between Time Warner Cable and MSG; the two sides had an approximately 1-month contract dispute that left games unavailable on cable for most of the state.

Games carried by TNT, TBS, ESPN, ABC, and CBC Television are not produced by the Sabres, and these television broadcasts are not considered to be part of the Sabres Hockey Network. The network produces "radio only" broadcasts for its terrestrial affiliates when an ABC game airs.

Former flagships

Personalities, past and present
Current:
Martin Biron, studio analyst
Brian Duff, TV studio host and occasional radio play-by-play announcer
Dan Dunleavy, play-by-play
Rob Ray, color commentator
Ralph Hass, voiceovers

Past:
Ted Darling, TV play-by-play (1970–1991)
Danny Gare, studio analyst/color commentator
John Gurtler, TV play-by-play (1991–1995)
Dave Hodge, radio play-by-play (1970–1971)
Rick Jeanneret, TV and radio play-by-play (1971–2022)
Jim Lorentz, color commentator (1981–2007)
Brad May, studio analyst (2014–2017)
Josh Mora, studio host
Harry Neale, color commentator (2008-2013)
Mike Robitaille, color commentator and studio analyst (1989–2014)
Kevin Sylvester, host of Hockey Hotline on WGR, studio host and substitute play-by-play (2005–2016)
Pete Weber, radio play-by-play (1995–1997)

Miscellaneous notes
The Sabres radio network also simulcasts Schopp and the Bulldog to WROC in Rochester.

The Rochester situation is unique in that a different station carries regular season games than in the postseason. This is because WROC has a much weaker AM signal, and the network switched to FM station WBZA to maximize coverage during the postseason. In 2008, with Entercom's purchase of WCMF, Sabres games moved to that station instead.

Since 1997, the radio play-by-play has been simulcast on the station's cable partner (Empire Sports Network from 1997 to 2004, and MSG Network/MSG Western New York from 2005 to the present). Prior to this, Ted Darling was the team's television play-by-play voice, though he was forced to retire due to Pick's disease in 1991. John Gurtler did TV play-by-play from 1991 to 1995, and Rick Jeanneret took over those duties from that point, adding radio simulcasts in 1997. Unlike most shows on MSG Network, the Sabres control all television broadcasts of their games.

See also
MSG Western New York, the TV broadcaster of the Sabres

References

External links
Buffalo Sabres Official Site - Sabres Hockey Network

National Hockey League on television
National Hockey League on the radio
Simulcasts
Audacy, Inc.
Sports radio networks in the United States
Pegula Sports and Entertainment